Dmitri Vyacheslavovich Bykov (born May 5, 1977) is a Russian former ice hockey defenceman.

Playing career 
Bykov has played one season in the NHL, the 2002–03 season with the Detroit Red Wings. In 71 games, he scored two goals and 10 assists for 12 points, with 43 penalty minutes. Bykov and Red Wings management had an agreement where Bykov could opt to return to Russia after the sole season, which he did.

Career statistics

Regular season and playoffs

International

References

External links

 

1977 births
Living people
Ak Bars Kazan players
Amur Khabarovsk players
Detroit Red Wings draft picks
Detroit Red Wings players
Atlant Moscow Oblast players
HC CSK VVS Samara players
HC Dynamo Moscow players
HC Lada Togliatti players
Metallurg Magnitogorsk players
Lokomotiv Yaroslavl players
Sportspeople from Izhevsk
Torpedo Nizhny Novgorod players
Russian ice hockey defencemen